Cheshmeh Barqi (also Romanized as Cheshmeh Barqī; also known as ‘Alīābād-e Cheshmeh Barqī) is a village in Qaleh-ye Mozaffari Rural District, in the Central District of Selseleh County, Lorestan Province, Iran. At the 2006 census, its population was 92, in 19 families.

References 

Towns and villages in Selseleh County